Pedococcus cremeus is a species of Gram positive, strictly aerobic, non-motile, non-endosporeforming bacterium. The species was initially isolated from forest soil from the Changbai Mountains. The species was first described in 2011, and its name refers to the cream-colored colonies the species produces on R2A agar.

The optimum growth temperature for P. cremeus is 29°C and can grow in the 14-35°C range.  The optimum pH is 7.0-8.0, and can grow in pH 4.1-10.0.

References

Intrasporangiaceae
Bacteria described in 2011